The Boyd–Wilson Farm is a  historic district in Franklin, Tennessee, United States. The circa 1840 farm includes an I-house.

The district was listed on the National Register of Historic Places in 1996. When listed, it included six contributing buildings, two contributing structures, one contributing site and two non-contributing buildings.

The farm's west edge is the West Harpeth River.  The property includes the historic Boyd Mill Ruins (separately listed on the National Register).

The farmhouse's north, two-story facade was built c.1884 and is of heavy braced frame construction.  It has a central hallway and chimneys at its gable ends in what is called an I-house.  The chimneys, originally limestone, were modified c.1920 to include brick.  It has a two-story portico with four square columns built in 1976 which replaced a one-story portico from c.1884.

It was deemed notable as "one of the few historic farms in Williamson County to retain its agricultural integrity from a period in the county's history when agriculture was the basis of prosperity."

It is a designated Century Farm.  Historic notability of properties of this type was covered in a 1994 study of historic family farms in Middle Tennessee.

See also
 Boyd Mill Ruins
 William Boyd House

References

Farmhouses in the United States
Houses in Franklin, Tennessee
I-houses in Tennessee
Houses completed in 1840
Farms on the National Register of Historic Places in Tennessee
Historic districts on the National Register of Historic Places in Tennessee
National Register of Historic Places in Williamson County, Tennessee
Historic farms in the United States
Century farms